Mount Ivy is a hamlet and census-designated place in the Town  of Haverstraw, in Rockland County, New York, United States. It is located north of New City, east of Pomona, south of Thiells, and west of Garnerville. The population was 6,878 at the 2010 census.

History

For many years, the Ramapough Mountain Indians were the inhabitants of this region.  It was also an important Quaker settlement.

The name Mount Ivy is said to have been given to the locality because of its elevation and ivy swamp.

Mount Ivy is the location where General Anthony Wayne's troops rested and concealed themselves before the assault of Stony Point fortress.

Geography
Mount Ivy is located at  (41.191839, -74.032162).

Mount Ivy straddles the border between the towns of Ramapo and Haverstraw, lying within southernmost Haverstraw.  The business center of Mount Ivy is located at the northern terminus of New York State Route 45, at its junction with U.S. Route 202, approximately ¼ mile east of the Mount Ivy exit of the Palisades Interstate Parkway.

Mount Ivy is primarily served by the Pomona post office. The hamlet is split between the North Rockland School District and The East Ramapo School District.

Demographics

As of the census of 2000, there were 6,536 people, 2,693 households, and 1,728 families residing in the CDP. The population density was 4,456.8 per square mile (1,716.7/km2). There were 2,761 housing units at an average density of 1,882.7/sq mi (725.2/km2). The racial makeup of the CDP was 78.93% White, 8.48% African American, 0.43% Native American, 4.39% Asian, 0.06% Pacific Islander, 4.44% from other races, and 3.27% from two or more races. Hispanic or Latino of any race were 13.51% of the population. There were 2,693 households, out of which 31.0% had children under the age of 18 living with them, 48.2% were married couples living together, 12.5% had a female householder with no husband present, and 35.8% were non-families. 29.7% of all households were made up of individuals, and 6.6% had someone living alone who was 65 years of age or older. The average household size was 2.42 and the average family size was 3.04.

In the CDP, the population was 23.5% under the age of 18, 7.0% from 18 to 24, 34.8% from 25 to 44, 26.1% from 45 to 64, and 8.6% who were 65 years of age or older. The median age was 36 years. For every 100 females, there were 90.4 males. For every 100 females age 18 and over, there were 85.8 males. The median income for a household in the CDP was $51,935, and the median income for a family was $61,968. Males had a median income of $42,205 versus $38,071 for females. The per capita income for the CDP was $25,685. About 6.9% of families and 8.0% of the population were below the poverty line, including 10.7% of those under age 18 and 7.4% of those age 65 or over.

References

Census-designated places in New York (state)
Hamlets in New York (state)
Census-designated places in Rockland County, New York
Hamlets in Rockland County, New York